Dr. Kálmán Czakó (18 April 1919 – 15 September 1985) was a Hungarian jurist, who served as Chief Prosecutor of Hungary from 1953 to 1955. He functioned as Deputy Minister of Justice between 1952 and 1953.

References
 Történelmi Tár adatbázisa

1919 births
1985 deaths
Hungarian Communist Party politicians
Members of the Hungarian Working People's Party
Hungarian jurists
People from Nagykáta